Andrea Rangel (born ) is a Mexican female volleyball player. She is a member of the Mexico women's national volleyball team and played for Nuevo León in 2014. 

She was the captain of the Mexico national team at the 2014 FIVB Volleyball Women's World Championship in Italy.

Clubs
  Nuevo León (2014)
  Puerto Rico (2019)
  Dinamo Metar (2021)

Awards

Individuals
 2015 NORCECA Championship "Best Outside Hitter"
 2015 NORCECA Championship "Best Scorer"

References

1993 births
Living people
Mexican women's volleyball players
Place of birth missing (living people)